Tatyana Yuryevna Gorbunova (born 25 January 1995) is a Russian deaf cross-country skier.

Career 
She made her debut appearance at the Winter Deaflympics representing Russia during the 2015 Winter Deaflympics but went medalless.

She also represented Russia at the 2019 Winter Deaflympics and claimed two bronze medals in women's 3km individual classic and sprint classic events.

References 

1995 births
Living people
Russian female cross-country skiers
Deaf skiers
Russian deaf people
Deaflympic bronze medalists for Russia
Medalists at the 2019 Winter Deaflympics
Cross-country skiers at the 2015 Winter Deaflympics
Cross-country skiers at the 2019 Winter Deaflympics
21st-century Russian women